Farouk al-Sharaa (born 10 December 1938) is a Syrian politician and diplomat. He is one of the most prominent officials in the Syrian government and served as foreign minister of Syria from 1984 until 2006 when he became Vice President of Syria.

Early life and education
Sharaa was born in Daraa on 10 December 1938 to a Sunni Muslim family that originates from the Daraa Governorate. He studied English language at the University of Damascus in the 1960s, earning a Bachelor of Arts degree in English Literature in 1963. In 1971 and 1972 he took courses in international law at the University of London.

Early career
In 1963, Sharaa became a member of the Ba'ath Party’s central committee. He served as regional manager of the state-run Syrian Arab Airlines in London from 1968 to 1972 and as commercial director in Damascus from 1972 to 1976. Between 1977 and 1980, he served as Syria's ambassador to Italy. In 1980 he was named deputy foreign minister. In 1984 Sharaa was appointed acting minister of information. In March 1984, Hafez al-Assad, then president of Syria, named him Minister of Foreign Affairs, a position that he held until February 2006.

Old guard of the Assad government
Sharaa has remained an old guard of the Assad administration. He has been very active in negotiating with many countries to gain better relations for Syria. Much of this negotiation has involved Syria's relationships with Lebanon and Israel. Sharaa maintains that Israel should give back all of the Golan Heights, the territory it took from Syria in the 1967 War. He was involved in two attempts to negotiate a reconciliation with Israel, in 1991 and 2000.

Political career
Since Hafez Assad's death in 2000, his son Bashar al-Assad reshuffled his cabinet several times to remove several long-time members. Sharaa, however, remained in office, and became one of the longest-serving foreign ministers in the world. It was believed that Sharaa might be forced to resign when, in October 2005, he was accused of misleading international investigators in letters about the investigation of possible Syrian involvement in the assassination of former Lebanese prime minister Rafik Hariri. Along with President Bashar al-Assad, Sharaa was interviewed in April 2006 during the course of a UN investigation into the death in February 2005 of former Lebanese Prime Minister Rafik Hariri.

He finally did leave his post as foreign minister on 11 February 2006, when he became vice president of Syria in charge of foreign affairs. This position had been vacant for a year since the departure of Abdul Halim Khaddam. Some saw his appointment as vice president as a demotion, since he was expected to have less of a public role in Syrian politics and to lose contact with many diplomats and world leaders. The vice president in Syria is generally a ceremonial role. However, others believed that Sharaa would now have a greater role in decision-making, since he would be in Syria more often. In the event, Sharaa engaged in high-profile foreign travel as vice president, indicating that his role is envisaged as an active one on the international scene. He will also become the acting president of Syria if President Assad resigns or dies while Sharaa is still vice president.

Sharaa met with Pope Benedict XVI in September 2007 to discuss the plight of Iraqi Christian refugees in Syria, the Mideast peace processes, and the role and status of the Church in Syria. Sharaa is the chairman of the "national dialogue" committee in Syria.

In 2000 Sharaa was also appointed to the Ba'ath party’s leadership and his term ended in July 2013.

Reports of escape
Following his absence at a high-level meeting in July 2012, Sharaa was rumored to either be under house-arrest, or to have fled to Jordan. These reports came amidst a wave of fugitives from the Assad government after an increase in violence in the Syrian civil war. However, these reports were proven to be false, since Sharaa represented Bashar al-Assad at the funerals of three senior officials assassinated on 18 July 2012 in Damascus.

In mid-August the spokesperson of the Free Syrian Army announced that Sharaa had fled to Jordan. A spokesman for Sharaa denied this report to the Syrian Arab News Agency (SANA). On 26 August 2012, Sharaa appeared in public in Syria for a second time, disproving false reports that he had fled to Jordan.

Personal life
Sharaa is married and has two children.

References

External links

1938 births
Living people
20th-century Syrian politicians
21st-century Syrian politicians
Alumni of the University of London
Ambassadors of Syria to Italy
Deputy Prime Ministers of Syria
Foreign ministers of Syria
Members of the Regional Command of the Arab Socialist Ba'ath Party – Syria Region
Syrian ministers of information
Syrian ministers of justice
Syrian Sunni Muslims
Vice presidents of Syria
People from Daraa